Nova Vas pri Šmarju is a small settlement in the Municipality of Šmarje pri Jelšah in eastern Slovenia. It lies in the hills north of Šmarje on the road to Sladka Gora. The area is part of the historical region of Styria and is now included in the Savinja Statistical Region.

Name
The name of the settlement was changed from Nova vas to Nova vas pri Šmarju in 1953.

References

External links
Nova Vas pri Šmarju at Geopedia

Populated places in the Municipality of Šmarje pri Jelšah